Vetagadu is a 1979 Indian Telugu-language action film, produced by M. Arjuna Raju and K. Sivarama Raju under the Roja Movies banner and directed by K. Raghavendra Rao. It stars N. T. Rama Rao and Sridevi, with music composed by Chakravarthy. The film was remade in Hindi as Nishana (1980). Both movies were made under the same banner and by the same director.

Plot 
Ananda Bhupathi and his wife Gayatri Devi belong to a rich and royal dynasty. Ananda Bhupathi constructs a huge palace in the middle of a forest and on the next day, during the palace opening ceremony Gruhapravesam, their Diwanji Sivanandam tries to kidnap Gayatri Devi for an ancestral Rajkamal necklace which is always worn by Gayatri Devi. This necklace is precious and expensive. Gayatri Devi somehow escapes from him. He secretly gives the necklace to an Adivasi Koya Dora and tells him to put the necklace on their goddess statue and to never give it to anyone until she returns. Kalyana Gajapathi, who belongs to another royal dynasty, is a close friend to Ananda Bhupathi, who tries to save Gayatri Devi, but he is brutally killed by Diwanji. The Diwan creates a story that Kalyana Gajapathi has taken away Gayatri Devi for the Rajkamal necklace. This leads to a royal feud between the families. After twenty-five years Roja, daughter of Ananda Bhupathi, and Raja, the son of Kalyana Gajapathi, meet in a forest trip and fall in love with each other. But as her father Ananda Bhupathi learns that he is the son of Kalyana Gajapathi he disagrees with the marriage proposal. The rest of the story is about how Raja proves his father's innocence.

Cast 
N. T. Rama Rao as Raja
Sridevi as Roja
Rao Gopal Rao as Sivanandam
Satyanarayana as Hari
Allu Ramalingaiah as Kanda
Jaggayya as Ananda Bhupati
Kanta Rao as Kalyana Gajapati
Nagesh as Ponnu Swamy
Chalapathi Rao as Tribal leader
Chidatala Appa Rao as Godugu
Pandari Bai as Ayah
Pushpalata as Gayatri Devi
Mamata as Dhillu
Jayamalini in item number

Production 
The producers were not convinced with K. Raghavendra Rao's choice of the female lead being Sridevi because she was "very young". After Rao convinced N. T. Rama Rao, Sridevi was cast.

Soundtrack 

The music was composed by Chakravarthy. Lyrics were written by Veturi.

References

External links 
 

Indian action films
1979 action films
1979 films
1970s Telugu-language films
1970s masala films
Telugu films remade in other languages
Films directed by K. Raghavendra Rao
Films scored by K. Chakravarthy
Films set in forests